Gluringen railway station, is a railway station in the locality of Reckingen-Gluringen, within the municipality of Goms, in the Swiss canton of Valais. It is an intermediate stop on the  gauge Furka Oberalp line of the Matterhorn Gotthard Bahn and is served by local trains only.

Services 
The following services stop at Gluringen:

References

External links 
 
 

Railway stations in the canton of Valais
Matterhorn Gotthard Bahn stations